B. L. Verma is an Indian politician and current Minister of State in the Ministry of Development of North Eastern Region and
Minister of State in the Ministry of Co-operation, Government of India. He is a Member of Parliament in Rajya Sabha, the Upper House of the Indian Parliament. He is the current state vice-president of Bharatiya Janata Party, Uttar Pradesh.

Verma is the also Chairman of U.P. State Construction And Infrastructure Development Corporation Limited since 2018.

Political career

Verma started off as a party worker from Badaun. He holds the charge of state vice-president since 2018. He is a prominent leader among the OBC communities especially the Lodhi community in western UP. Verma is a former president of the Braj region. He is considered as a close-aide of former CM Kalyan Singh.

He also holds the post of chairman of UP State Construction Development Corporation Limited (UP Samaj Kalyan Nirman Nigam) which has the same status as of a Minister of State.

References

Living people
Bharatiya Janata Party politicians from Uttar Pradesh
Rajya Sabha members from Uttar Pradesh
Year of birth missing (living people)